Talk About a Lady is a 1946 American musical film directed by George Sherman and starring Forrest Tucker and Jinx Falkenburg.

Plot

References

External links

Talk About a Lady at Library of Congress
Talk About a Lady at TCMDB

1940s English-language films
1946 films
American musical films
Films directed by George Sherman
1946 musical films
American black-and-white films
1940s American films